The Premio Cuervo Tradicional (English: Cuervo Traditional Award) is a lifetime achievement or career recognition award presented at the Morelia International Film Festival by its sponsors, José Cuervo, to recognize a Mexican cinema personality.

Prize 
The prize includes a statuette called El Ojo, by Javier Marín, and a monetary award of 120,000 or 130,000 pesos to be put towards a future project; this is said to affirm support for Mexican filmmaking excellence and allow those in cinema to continue creating. In 2009, recipient Carlos Cuarón put the funds towards creating the short film The Second Bakery Attack.

History and recipients 
First awarded in 2005, the Premio Cuervo Tradicional has been given to one individual each year since. Its first female recipient was Cecilia Suárez in 2018. Accepting it, Suárez said that she hoped more actresses and female filmmakers would be recognized in the future of the award. Six of the fifteen recipients are actors, the rest directors.

Recipients are:

References

Lifetime achievement awards
Mexican culture